Horace Capron Jr. (October 27, 1839 – February 6, 1864) was an American soldier who fought in the American Civil War. Capron received the country's highest award for bravery during combat, the Medal of Honor, for his action at Chickahominy and Ashland in Virginia in June 1862.

Biography
Capron was born in Laurel, Maryland, on October 27, 1839. The 1860 U.S. census identifies him as the son of head-of-household Horace Capron in Peoria, Illinois.

He joined the 8th Illinois Cavalry at Peoria as a corporal in September 1861, and was promoted to sergeant in 1862. He was later commissioned as a first lieutenant of the 14th Illinois Cavalry, his father's regiment. Capron's horse was killed during a skirmish in September 1863 near Kingsport, Tennessee.

Capron was mortally wounded on February 2, 1864, during a charge near Qualla Town, North Carolina. He died from his wounds on February 6, 1864, in Knoxville, Tennessee, where he had been transported. His remains are interred at the Springdale Cemetery and Mausoleum in Peoria. He was posthumously awarded the Medal of Honor on September 27, 1865.

Medal of Honor citation

See also

List of American Civil War Medal of Honor recipients: A–F

Notes

References

External links

1839 births
1864 deaths
People of Illinois in the American Civil War
Union Army officers
United States Army Medal of Honor recipients
American Civil War recipients of the Medal of Honor
People from Laurel, Maryland
People from Peoria, Illinois
Union military personnel killed in the American Civil War